Hope Robina Mukisa (born 4 September 1991) is a Ugandan female legislator and politician. She is the district woman representative for Namayingo District in the Parliament of Uganda. She joined Parliament in 2016 on the National Resistance Movement party (NRM) ticket, the party in political leadership in Uganda under the chairmanship of Yoweri Kaguta Museveni, the president of the Republic of Uganda.

Education 
Mukisa attended St. Michael High School Mukono where she sat her Uganda Advanced Certificate of Education (UACE) in 2010. She thereafter attended Makerere University and graduated with a bachelor's degree in commerce (BCOM) in 2016.

Career 
Mukisa is a member of Parliament of Uganda representing the people of Namayingo district as a district woman representative, a position she has held since 2016. In parliament, she serves on the Committee on Tourism Trade and Industry. She is also a member of the Uganda Women Parliamentary Association (UWOPA), where she serves on the "succession act" round table committee. and

References 

National Resistance Movement politicians
1991 births
Women members of the Parliament of Uganda
Makerere University alumni
Members of the Parliament of Uganda
Living people
21st-century Ugandan politicians
21st-century Ugandan women politicians